Annakili is a 1976 Indian Tamil-language romantic drama film, directed by Devaraj–Mohan and written by Panchu Arunachalam from a story by R. Selvaraj. The film stars Sivakumar and Sujatha with S. V. Subbaiah, Srikanth, Thengai Srinivasan and Fatafat Jayalaxmi in supporting roles. It was produced by S. P. Thamizharasi under the production banner SPT Films. The film's soundtrack was composed by Ilaiyaraaja, who made his debut in film. A. Somasundaram and Kandasamy handled cinematography and editing respectively.

When Ilaiyaraaja met Panchu Arunachalam, the latter asked if the former had composed any songs; Ilaiyaraaja casually sang a bunch of songs, one of which was "Annakkili Unnai Theduthe". An impressed Panchu Arunachalam decided to write a film story to accommodate these songs, which became Annakili. The film was released on 14 May 1976 and became a commercial success. It was screened at the Indian Panorama section of the International Film Festival of India in 1978. It was remade in Telugu as Rama Chilaka (1978).

Plot 

The movie revolves around Annakili, who falls in love with teacher Thyagarajan. Due to circumstances, Thyagarajan marries another girl. Azhagappan, a womaniser creates a misunderstanding about Annakili among the villagers; the rest of the film shows how Annakili proves her innocence.

Cast 
Sivakumar as Thyagarajan
Sujatha as Annakili
S. V. Subbaiah as Vadivel Ambal
Srikanth as Magudapathy
Thengai Srinivasan as Azhagappan
Vennira Aadai Moorthy as Azhagappan's right hand man
Senthamarai as Madasamy
Fatafat Jayalaxmi as Sumathi
Manimala as Thyagarajan's sister
M. N. Rajam as
S. N. Lakshmi as Thyagarajan's mother

Production 
When Ilaiyaraaja met Panchu Arunachalam, the latter asked if the former had composed any songs; Ilaiyaraaja casually sang a bunch of songs, one of which was "Annakkili Unnai Theduthe". An impressed Panchu Arunachalam decided to write a screenplay based on these songs and on story Marathuvechi written by R. Selvaraj to accommodate these songs; the film would be titled Annakili. While scouting for various locations, it was Sivakumar who finally zeroed in and suggested a village Thengumarahada situated at Kovai district which had only 10 homes and mostly has huts where they primarily shot the film except for the climax which was shot in Chennai and Salem Ratna Studios. The filming was completed within a month. The film was made on a shoestring budget under ₹4 lakh (worth ₹4.7 crore in 2021 prices) The climax, featuring a theatre being set on fire, was inspired by the film Kannagi.

Soundtrack 

The soundtrack was composed by Ilaiyaraaja, who made his debut as composer with this film, and the lyrics were written by Panchu Arunachalam. When Arunachalam was in search of new composer who can deliver new kind of music, it was Selvaraj who suggested Raja's name. Arunachalam added "Ilaiya" (Ilaiya means younger in Tamil) as prefix in his name Raaja and he named as "Ilaiyaraaja" to differentiate from the already established composer A. M. Rajah. For the soundtrack, Ilaiyaraaja applied the techniques of modern popular film music orchestration to Tamil folk poetry and folk song melodies, which created a fusion of Western and Tamil idioms. The song "Machanai Paartheengala" was originally composed and sung at a marriage by Ilaiyaraaja and his orchestra even before the film's release. The violin portions of the song were used by K for the "Bar Anthem" in Mugamoodi (2012). The song "Sonthamillai Banthamillai" is based on Nadanamakriya raga. Arunachalam revealed he wrote lyrics for the song "Sondhamillai" even before its tune was composed while lyrics for songs "Machanai", "Annakili Unnai" and "Suttha Samba" were written after its tunes were composed.

When the song "Annakili Unnai" was being recorded, during the first take the studio faced a power cut though it was recorded in second take but the song was not recorded clearly as the recorder's assistant forgot to plug in the switch but it was finalised in third take.

The song "Sonthamillai Banthamillai" was deleted during the first release of the film however after fans demanded the song it was later again added into the film.

The soundtrack became hugely popular and its success established Ilaiyaraaja as a leading composer in Tamil cinema.

Release and reception 
After the completion, many of the distributors refused to buy this film as they felt like a art film which led Arunchalam to sell the film to new distributors on a low price. Annakili was released on 14 May 1976. Ananda Vikatan, in a review dated 30 May 1976, was positive towards the film, particularly the performances of Sujatha, Sivakumar and Srikanth, but felt it would have been better in colour. According to Sivakumar, the response for first two shows were poor, it picked up only in third day due to positive word-of-mouth. The film ran successfully for 25 weeks and celebrated silver jubilee and it ran for 205 days in Irudhaya Theatre at Kovai.

The film won the FilmFare Best Film Award of the year and also received ₹1 lakh subsidy from the Government of Tamil Nadu.

References

Bibliography

External links 
 

1970s Tamil-language films
1976 films
Films directed by Devaraj–Mohan
Films scored by Ilaiyaraaja
Films with screenplays by Panchu Arunachalam
Indian romantic drama films
1976 romantic drama films
Tamil films remade in other languages